Malkajgiri mandal is one of the 15 mandals in Medchal–Malkajgiri district of the Indian state of Telangana. It is under the administration of Malkajgiri revenue division with its headquarters at Malkajgiri. The mandal is bounded by Alwal, Kapra, Uppal mandals and Hyderabad district.
Malkajgiri and also Municipality till 2007, which is a suburb in (Erstwhile) Hyderabad city, now it is a circle in Greater Hyderabad Municipal Corporation.

Demographics

As of the 2001 India census,. Malkajgiri had a population of 413,571. The population is 51% male and 49% female. Malkajgiri has an average literacy ratio of 87% with 321,525 total people literated. In terms of literacy, Malkajgiri ranks at 1st in K.V.Rangareddy district, higher than the national average of 59.5%; male literacy is 72%, and female literacy is 65%. In Malkajgiri, 7% of the population is under 6 years of age.

Villages in Malkajgiri mandal 
Malkajgiri is a Mandal in Ranga Reddy (Eastrwile) district of Telangana state in India. Below is the list of Towns and Villages in Malkajgiri Mandal. Total Number of villages in this Mandal list are 12.

Alwal (Municipality)
Ammuguda
Kowkur
Lothkunta
Macha Bolaram
Malkajgiri (Municipality)
Yapral
Later in 2017 some villages merged in Alwal and formed Alwal Mandal by burificating Malkajgiri Mandal .

At Present now Malkajgiri Mandal has following neighbourhoods erstwhile Villages:
 Malkajgiri Village (Including Talla Basthi, Mirzalguda & Hanumanpet Hamlet Villages)
 Moula Ali Village 
 Neredmet Village (Including Ramakrishnapuram Hamlet village , Safilguda Hamlet Village) .
 Ammuguda Village
Kapargutta

GHMC wards in Malkajgiri mandal
 136 Neredmet division
 137 Vinayak nagar division 
 138 Moula Ali  division 
 139 East anandbagh division
 140 Malkajgiri division
 141 Goutham Nagar division

References 

Neighbourhoods in Hyderabad, India
Mandals in Telangana
Medchal–Malkajgiri district